
Year 166 BC was a year of the pre-Julian Roman calendar. At the time it was known as the Year of the Consulship of Marcellus and Galus (or, less frequently, year 588 Ab urbe condita). The denomination 166 BC for this year has been used since the early medieval period, when the Anno Domini calendar era became the prevalent method in Europe for naming years.

Events 
 By place 

 Seleucid Empire 
 The Seleucid king Antiochus IV mounts a campaign against the Parthians who are threatening his empire in the east. He leaves his chancellor, Lysias, with responsibility for the government of southern Syria and the guardianship of his son.
 The leader of the Jewish revolt against Syria rule, Mattathias, dies and his third son, Judas, assumes leadership of the revolt in accordance with the deathbed deposition of his father.
 The Battle of Beth Horon is fought between Jewish forces led by Judas Maccabeus and a Seleucid army. Maccabeus gains the element of surprise and successfully routs the much larger Syrian army.
 The Battle of Emmaus takes place between the Jewish rebels led by Judas Maccabeus and Seleucid forces sent by Antiochus IV and led by Lysias and his general, Gorgias. In the ensuing battle, Judas Maccabeus and his men succeed in repelling Gorgias and forcing his army out of Judea and down to the coastal plain in what is an important victory in the war for Judea's independence.

 Roman Republic 
 The Roman playwright Terence's Andria (The Girl from Andros) is first performed at the Megalesian games.

 China 
 Laoshang leads 140,000 Xiongnu cavalry in a raid in Anding, and they reach as far as the royal retreat at Yong.

Deaths 
 Mattathias, father of Judas Maccabaeus, Jewish priest from Modi'in, near Jerusalem, who has started and briefly led a rebellion by the Jews in Judea against the Seleucid kingdom of Syria
 Perseus, the last Macedonian king of the Antigonid dynasty (b. c. 212 BC)

References